In algebraic geometry, the theorem of absolute (cohomological) purity is an important theorem in the theory of étale cohomology. It states: given
a regular scheme X over some base scheme,
 a closed immersion of a regular scheme of pure codimension r,
an integer n that is invertible on the base scheme,
for each integer , the map

The theorem was introduced in SGA 5 Exposé I, § 3.1.4. as an open problem. Later, Thomason proved it for large n and Gabber in general.

See also 
purity (algebraic geometry)

References 

Fujiwara, K.: A proof of the absolute purity conjecture (after Gabber). Algebraic geometry 2000, Azumino (Hotaka), pp. 153–183, Adv. Stud. Pure Math. 36, Math. Soc. Japan, Tokyo, 2002
R. W. Thomason, Absolute cohomological purity, Bull. Soc. Math. France 112 (1984), no. 3, 397–406. MR 794741

Algebraic geometry